Tom Lord-Alge (born January 17, 1963) is an American music engineer and mixer. He began his career at The Hit Factory in New York. Subsequently, he was the resident mixer at what used to be known as "South Beach Studios", located on the ground floor of the Marlin Hotel.

Lord-Alge received two Grammy Awards for his work on Steve Winwood's Back in the High Life (1986), and Roll with It (1988), both winning in the 'Best Engineered Recording – Non-Classical' category. His third Grammy was for Santana's Supernatural (1999), which won Album of the Year. Lord-Alge has mixed records for U2, Simple Minds, The Rolling Stones, Pink, Peter Gabriel, OMD, Sarah McLachlan, Dave Matthews Band, Blink-182, Avril Lavigne, Hanson, Sum 41, Live, Manic Street Preachers, New Found Glory, Story of the Year and Marilyn Manson, among others.

Career
After doing live sound engineering for some time, Lord-Alge joined his older brother Chris at Unique Recording in New York City in 1984. He began working as an assistant to Chris, who was then a staff engineer, and later became staff engineer until 1988. 

Lord-Alge's first major project was engineering Steve Winwood's Grammy winning album Back in the High Life (1986) including its number one hit song "Higher Love". He went on to engineer Winwood's follow up Roll with It (1988) including its chart-topping title track. He then left Unique Recording to work as a freelance engineer and mixer.

Lord-Alge's turning point as a mixing engineer was in 1993 after mixing Crash Test Dummies' God Shuffled His Feet, featuring their hit "Mmm Mmm Mmm Mmm". Shortly thereafter he mixed Live's multi-platinum Throwing Copper, which to date has sold over eight million copies in the United States. The success of these albums marked the beginning of Lord-Alge's professional career as a mix engineer. He mixed out of South Beach Studios in Miami prior to it closing, and is represented exclusively by Global Positioning Services Management in Santa Monica.

Like his brother Chris, Lord-Alge is well known for his extensive use of compression in mix down as both a creative and functional technique.

Personal life
Lord-Alge is one of four brothers and two sisters (Meg and Lisa), two of whom are audio and mixing engineers, namely Chris and Jeff Lord-Alge. Their mother, Vivian Lord, was a jazz singer and pianist, while their father sold jukeboxes for a living. Tom Lord-Alge credits his brother Chris as being a strong influence on his early development as an engineer and mixer.

References

External links
 [ AllMusic.com entry]
 
 
 S.O.S. Article
 Artist Direct entry

1963 births
Living people
Record producers from New Jersey
American audio engineers
Mixing engineers
Grammy Award winners
Place of birth missing (living people)